Paul Max Fritz Jahr (January 18, 1895 in Halle (Saale) —October 1, 1953) was a German theologian, pastor and teacher in Halle. He is considered the founder of bioethics.

See also 
 Van Rensselaer Potter

References 

1895 births
1953 deaths
German theologians
People from Halle (Saale)
Bioethicists